Melchior-Alphonse de Salaberry (or Melchior-Alphonse d'Irumberry de Salaberry; May 19, 1813 – March 27, 1867) was a Canadien lawyer and political figure.

He was born in Saint-Philippe-de-Laprairie, Lower Canada in 1813, the son of Charles-Michel d'Irumberry de Salaberry, the hero of the Battle of Chateauguay.

He was appointed commissioner for small causes in 1836. In 1837, he was named to the Legislative Council of Lower Canada, but never took his seat due to the Lower Canada Rebellion. In the same year, he was appointed lieutenant-colonel in the local militia and prevented the capture of Fort Chambly by the Patriotes. In 1841, he was elected to the Legislative Assembly of the Province of Canada for Rouville. He was forced to run again for his seat in 1842 after accepting the post of clerk of the Richelieu district court; however, he was defeated by William Walker. He was admitted to the bar in 1845 and practised law with Robert-Shore-Milnes Bouchette. In 1847, he was appointed assistant coroner of Montreal and, in 1848, assistant adjutant-general of the Lower Canada militia. He served in this last post until his death at Quebec City in 1867.

Family

Melchior-Alphonse de Salaberry married Marie-Émilie Guy, the daughter of Louis Guy, in 1846. The couple's daughter, Miss Hermine de Salaberry was a native of Quebec, and was educated in Quebec city and in Montreal. In 1889, she was accorded a private audience with Her
Majesty Queen Victoria at the instance of H.R.H. the Princess Louise (later Duchess of Argyll). In October 1895, Hermione unveiled the monument to Charles-Michel d'Irumberry de Salaberry, which commemorates the Battle of Chateauguay. The de Salaberry family resided at 833 Sherbrooke Street, Montreal.

References 
 

La famille d'Irumberry de Salaberry, P-G Roy (1906)

1813 births
1867 deaths
Members of the Legislative Assembly of the Province of Canada from Canada East
Canadian people of Basque descent
Canadian coroners